Johannes Jacobus Neeskens (born 15 September 1951) is a Dutch football manager and former player. A midfielder, he was an important member of the Netherlands national team that finished as runners-up in the 1974 and 1978 FIFA World Cups and is considered one of the greatest midfielders of all time. In 2004, he was named one of the 125 Greatest Living Footballers at a FIFA Awards Ceremony, while in 2017 he has been included in the FourFourTwo list of the 100 all-time greatest players, at the 64th position.

After his retirement in 1991, Neeskens was the assistant coach to Frank Rijkaard at Barcelona but was sacked along with Rijkaard at the end of the 2007–08 season. He later became head coach of the Netherlands B national team until June 2009, at which date he has been appointed as the assistant coach to Frank Rijkaard at Galatasaray.

Club career
Neeskens, a native of Heemstede, started his career at Racing Club Heemstede in 1968, before being spotted by Rinus Michels and signed for Ajax in 1970. The youngster impressed at right-back, playing in that position for Ajax in the 1971 European Cup Final win against Panathinaikos. During the 1971–72 season, Neeskens took up more of a central midfield role, in support of Johan Cruyff. He adapted well to his new central midfield role because he was a tireless runner, had great technical skills and scored his fair share of goals. Ajax completed a hat-trick of European Cup wins between 1971 and 1973, and Neeskens moved on to FC Barcelona in 1974 to join Cruyff and Michels. There he was nicknamed Johan Segon (Johan the Second).

While his time at Barcelona was relatively unsuccessful for the club (one cup title in 1978, and the 1979 Cup Winners' Cup), he was hugely popular amongst the fans. In 1979 he accepted an offer from the New York Cosmos, spending five years at the club. The Cosmos released him in October 1984. He also played for FC Groningen during the 1984–85 season. In June 1985, he signed with the South Florida Sun of the United Soccer League. The USL collapsed six games into the 1985 season. On 15 August 1985, he signed with the Kansas City Comets of the Major Indoor Soccer League.

He then played for FC Baar (1988–90) and FC Zug in Switzerland, finally retiring in 1991.

International career

 

Neeskens was capped 49 times for the Netherlands national team, scoring 17 goals. He made his debut against East Germany in 1970, and played a crucial role in the 1974 and 1978 FIFA World Cups, playing in central midfield. Neeskens scored the opening goal of the 1974 World Cup final against West Germany with a penalty kick after only two minutes of play.

Four years later, Neeskens was a crucial player for the Netherlands (despite a rib injury suffered in the Scotland defeat), in the absence of Cruyff who had retired from international football in 1977. The Netherlands again reached the final, only to lose again to the host nation, this time Argentina, going down 3–1 after extra time (the score at the end of regulation was 1–1). He played his final international game in 1981 in a 2–0 defeat against France in a qualifier for the 1982 World Cup.

Coaching career
At the request of Guus Hiddink, Neeskens, along with Frank Rijkaard and Ronald Koeman, acted as assistant coach for the Netherlands national team during the qualifiers and finals of the 1998 FIFA World Cup. When Hiddink stepped down as national coach after the 1998 FIFA World Cup, he performed the same role during the reign of Rijkaard as national coach up until the end of Euro 2000. He was then appointed as coach of Dutch side NEC Nijmegen, leading them to their first European appearance in twenty years in 2003, but was fired in 2004 because of poor results.

In December 2005, Neeskens was appointed assistant coach of the Australia national team, once again at the request of Guus Hiddink, the Soccerooss manager at the time. He worked alongside Hiddink and Graham Arnold as part of their World Cup 2006 campaign, and even afterwards he remained involved with the Australian national team: on 7 October 2006, under contract with FC Barcelona, Neeskens was alongside the Australia national team's bench in a friendly match between Paraguay while visiting Australia for a short break.

After the 2006 World Cup, Neeskens returned to FC Barcelona to replace Henk ten Cate in the club's technical staff, reuniting with Frank Rijkaard. The three-year deal was signed when Neeskens flew in from Germany following Australia's opening win over Japan, but on 8 May 2008, after two disappointing seasons, Barcelona's president Joan Laporta announced that Neeskens (as well as Rijkaard) were to leave Barcelona at the end of the season.

Neeskens joined Frank Rijkaard at Galatasaray as his assistant manager in 2009. He became the coach of South Africa-based club, Mamelodi Sundowns F.C. in 2011. His time with Mamelodi Sundowns was less than successful with the Dutch coach finding himself attacked by his own supporters following a string of poor results. As of 2 December 2012 Neeskens was no longer under the employment of Mamelodi Sundowns.

Style of play
Neeskens has been described on the UEFA website as having the "steel-hard midfielder was a tireless runner yet also had nice technique and scored goals, helping to set the stage for Cruyff to shine. One of the first box-to-box midfielders," he was great at pressuring opponents to regain possession too. "He was worth two men in midfield," said teammate Sjaak Swart.

Career statistics
Club

International

HonoursAjax Eredivisie: 1971–72, 1972–73
 KNVB Cup: 1970–71, 1971–72
 European Cup: 1970–71, 1971–72, 1972–73
 Intercontinental Cup: 1972
 European Super Cup: 1972, 1973Barcelona Copa del Rey: 1977–78
 European Cup Winners' Cup: 1978–79NetherlandsFIFA World Cup runner-up: 1974, 1978
UEFA European Championship third place: 1976Individual'
1974 FIFA World Cup Silver Boot
1974 FIFA World Cup All-Star Team
IOC European Footballer of the Season: 1971/72
Don Balón Award (La Liga Foreign Player of the Year): 1975–76
FIFA 100
Ballon d'Or Dream Team (Bronze): 2020

References

External links

 Johan Neeskens at Voetbal International 
 
 Johan Neesken's USA soccer league stats at nasljerseys.com
 Johan Neeskens CV Profile at Beijen.net 
 
 

1951 births
Living people
1974 FIFA World Cup players
1978 FIFA World Cup players
AFC Ajax players
Catalonia international guest footballers
Expatriate footballers in Spain
Expatriate footballers in Switzerland
Expatriate soccer players in the United States
Dutch footballers
Dutch expatriate footballers
Dutch expatriate sportspeople in Spain
Dutch expatriate sportspeople in Switzerland
Dutch expatriate sportspeople in the United States
Dutch football managers
Eredivisie players
Dutch expatriate football managers
Expatriate soccer managers in South Africa
FC Barcelona players
FC Groningen players
FIFA 100
Fort Lauderdale Sun players
Kansas City Comets (original MISL) players
La Liga players
Major Indoor Soccer League (1978–1992) players
NEC Nijmegen managers
Mamelodi Sundowns F.C. managers
Netherlands international footballers
New York Cosmos players
North American Soccer League (1968–1984) players
People from Heemstede
UEFA Euro 1976 players
United Soccer League (1984–85) players
Galatasaray S.K. (football) non-playing staff
Association football midfielders
Racing Club Heemstede players
Dutch expatriate sportspeople in Turkey
Footballers from North Holland
Dutch expatriate sportspeople in Australia